Perseverance may refer to:

Behaviour
 Psychological resilience
 Perseverance of the saints, a Protestant Christian teaching
 Assurance (theology)

Geography
 Perseverance, Queensland, a locality in Australia
 Perseverance Island, Seychelles
 Perseverance Mountain, Canada
 De Volharding, Jislum, a wind mill in the Netherlands
 Perseverance Tavern, a pub in Cape Town, South Africa
 The Perseverance, a pub in London, England
 Perseverance School, a Christian institution in South Africa

Music
 Perseverance (Hatebreed album)
 Perseverance (Percee P album)
 "Perseverance" (song), on Terrorvision's 1996 album Regular Urban Survivors
 Perseverance Records, an American record label

Vehicles

 Perseverance (rover), a planetary rover landed on Mars by NASA
 Perseverance (ship), various watercraft so named
 Perseverance (Rainhill Trials), an early Scottish steam locomotive prototype
 LMS Jubilee Class 5731 Perseverance, a steam locomotive of the London, Midland and Scottish Railway (LMS)
 Natal Railway 4-4-0T Perseverance, a series of four South African steam locomotives

Other
 Perseverance (solitaire), a traditional playing-card game
 Brock Lesnar (born 1977; ring name: Perseverance), American wrestler and MMA fighter
 The Perseverance, a collection of poetry by Raymond Antrobus
 975 Perseverantia, a Koronian asteroid

See also